The Louisiana Highway 1 Bridge, also known as the Gateway to the Gulf Expressway, is a concrete trestle toll bridge in the U.S. state of Louisiana.

The bridge carries Louisiana Highway 1 over Bayou Lafourche and marshes in south Louisiana. It is located in Lafourche Parish, Louisiana. The bridge, which opened in 2009, connects Leeville to Port Fourchon, with a planned future expansion northward to Golden Meadow. The toll rates as of November 2020 are $3.75 for 2-axle vehicles, $5.50 for 3-axle vehicles, $7.50 for 4-axle vehicles, $15.00 for 5-axle vehicles, and $18.00 for 6-axle vehicles.

See also
Louisiana Highway 1#Highway 1 elevated toll expressway
List of bridges in the United States
List of longest bridges

References

Bridges completed in 2009
Buildings and structures in Lafourche Parish, Louisiana
Transportation in Lafourche Parish, Louisiana
Road bridges in Louisiana
Toll bridges in Louisiana
Concrete bridges in the United States
Trestle bridges in the United States